John Daniel "Danny" Smith (15 May 1952 – 14 February 1983) was a Bahamian sprinter. He competed in the 4 × 100 metres relay at the 1972 Summer Olympics and the 1976 Summer Olympics. He won a silver medal in the 110 metres hurdles at the 1975 Pan American Games. Running for Florida State, he was the 1974-5 NCAA Indoor Champion for 60 yard hurdles.

References

1952 births
1983 deaths
Athletes (track and field) at the 1972 Summer Olympics
Athletes (track and field) at the 1976 Summer Olympics
Bahamian male sprinters
Bahamian male hurdlers
Olympic athletes of the Bahamas
Pan American Games silver medalists for the Bahamas
Pan American Games medalists in athletics (track and field)
Athletes (track and field) at the 1975 Pan American Games
Place of birth missing
Medalists at the 1975 Pan American Games